The men's Keirin competition of the cycling events at the 2011 Pan American Games was held on October 20 at the Pan American Velodrome in Guadalajara. The defending champion is Leonardo Narváez of Colombia.

Schedule
All times are Central Standard Time (UTC-6).

Results

First round
First 2 riders in each heat qualify to final, while the rest will race in the repechage.

First round repechage
The top two cyclists advanced to the final.

Final

References

Men's keirin
Track cycling at the 2011 Pan American Games